Derryclare is a mountain at the southern edge of Twelve Bens mountain range in Connemara National Park in County Galway, Ireland. At , it is the 119th–highest peak in Ireland on the Arderin list, and the 145th–highest peak on the Vandeleur-Lynam list. It is the 5th tallest of the core Twelve Bens. The Derryclare Lough on its southern slopes is a scenic location in Connemara, while Derryclare Wood, on its eastern slopes, contains a Statutory Nature Reserve (SRN).

Derryclare's prominence of  does not qualify it as a Marilyn, however, it does rank as the 72nd-highest mountain in Ireland on the MountainViews Online Database, 100 Highest Irish Mountains, where the minimum prominence threshold is 100 metres.

Naming
The name "Derryclare" comes from Irish Doire Chláir;  means "an oak wood", and  can mean either a "plain" or a "board/plank-bridge". Irish academic Paul Tempan says Ordnance Survey Ireland most likely transferred the name from the nearby townland of Derryclare, east of the mountain.

Geography
Derryclare is one of the most southerly of the Bens and sits at the eastern side of the entrance to the large U-shaped valley of the Glencoaghan River.  To the south of Derrclare is the scenic lake of Derryclare Lough, and to the east is the large Inagh Valley, and Lough Inagh.

Derryclare's only neighbour is Bencorr , the 2nd-highest peak in the Twelve Bens range, to which it is connected by a high northern rocky ridge.  Derryclare and Bencorr form a large deep eastern corrie called  (meaning "wood of the big corrie").

The corrie leads down to the Derryclare Wood, which includes a 19-hectare broadleaf forest that is a Statutory Nature Reserve (SRN), and a 789-hectare commercial conifer forest owned and operated by Coillte; both of which are bounded by Derryclare Lough and Lough Inagh.

Derryclare Nature Reserve 
In 1980, the Irish state designated 19-hectares of woodland on the eastern slopes of Derryclare as a Statutory Nature Reserve called the Derryclare Nature Reserve (or Derryclare Wood by some sources).  The broadleaf trees in the reserve are composed of Sessile Oak, with Rowan (Sorbus aucuparia), Downy Birch (Betula pubescens) and some Ash (Fraxinus excelsior) creating a canopy layer; there are well-developed lichen and fungus flora present. The fungal parasite, Hemigrapha astericus, a native of Australia and South America, was first recorded in the northern hemisphere in Derryclare Wood.

In 2005, 19 Irish red squirrels were translocated from Portumna Forest Park to Derryclare Wood as part of a programme to protect the species in Ireland.

Hill walking
Derryclare is one of the more accessible Twelve Bens, being situated near the N59 road, and a number of routes are available from the Glencoaghan Valley side in the west, or the Derryclare Nature Reserve side in the east, that climb to the summit and back.

Derryclare can be climbed in "horseshoe" walks such as the 11–14 kilometre 5–7 hour circuit of Bencorr (descending via Bencorr's easterly spur at the northern end of ), and/or Bencorr North Top (descending via Carrot Ridge, at the northern end of ).

Derryclare is also often climbed as part of the popular 16–kilometre 8–9 hour Glencoaghan Horseshoe, considered one of Ireland's best hill-walks.

Rock climbing
The large easterly corrie between the summit of Derryclare and the summit of Bencorr,  (meaning "wood of the big corrie"), contains several large 200 metre multi-pitch graded rock climbs of grades Diff (D) to Very Diff (VD), the most notable of which is The Knave (VD, 225 m).

Gallery

Bibliography

See also

Twelve Bens
Mweelrea, major range in Killary Harbour
Maumturks, major range in Connemara
Lists of mountains in Ireland
Lists of mountains and hills in the British Isles
List of Marilyns in the British Isles
List of Hewitt mountains in England, Wales and Ireland

References

External links
MountainViews: The Irish Mountain Website, Bencollaghduff 
MountainViews: Irish Online Mountain Database
The Database of British and Irish Hills , the largest database of British Isles mountains ("DoBIH")
Hill Bagging UK & Ireland, the searchable interface for the DoBIH

Marilyns of Ireland
Hewitts of Ireland
Mountains and hills of County Galway
Geography of County Galway
Mountains under 1000 metres